Ageleodus is an extinct genus of cartilaginous fish from the Paleozoic eon. It is known from two species, both of which are based upon isolated teeth. A. pectinatus is known from the Carboniferous of Europe and North America. A. altus was described in 2006 from the Carboniferous of Australia. This genus is also known from the Famennian of the Catskill formation at the Red Hill Site in Hyner, Pennsylvania. A study of 382 specimens from the site showed the strong heterodonty of this genus, which varies widely in tooth length and cusp number. This study described them as A. pectinatus, but the paper which described A. altus tentatively labeled them Ageleodus cf. A. altus. While generally considered an Elasmobranch, it has eluded classification into any known order or family.

References

Fossils of the United States
Devonian sharks
Carboniferous sharks
Cartilaginous fish genera